Tina Moore (born October 17, 1970, in Racine, Wisconsin) is an American R&B musician. She scored two Top 20 hit singles in the UK in 1997 with "Never Gonna Let You Go" (#7) and "Nobody Better" (#20). Both singles were UK garage remixes of songs from her 1995 album Tina Moore.

Discography

Studio albums

Singles

References

External links
 

Musicians from Racine, Wisconsin
Living people
American contemporary R&B singers
20th-century African-American women singers
UK garage singers
1970 births
21st-century American singers
21st-century American women singers
Scotti Brothers Records artists
21st-century African-American women singers